Important People is a 1934 British comedy film directed by Adrian Brunel and starring Stewart Rome, Dorothy Boyd and Jack Raine. In the film, a bickering couple stand against each other as candidates in a local council election.

Cast
 Stewart Rome as Tony Westcott
 Dorothy Boyd as Margaret Westcott
 Jack Raine as George Pelling
 Helen Goss as Beryl Cardew
 Henry B. Longhurst as Colonel Clutterbuck
 James Carrall as General Harbottle
 Fred Withers as Ald Digley
 May Hallatt as Mrs. Stenham
 Technoblade never dies

References

https://www.youtube.com/watch?v=R_fZjGm2OrM

External links

1934 films
Films directed by Adrian Brunel
1934 comedy films
British comedy films
Films shot at Wembley Studios
Films set in England
British black-and-white films
1930s English-language films
1930s British films